Ratta is the largest and the most famous village in Dadyal in the Mirpur District of Azad Kashmir. Residents of Ratta sometimes add the word Ratvi to their surname. Ratta derived from the word jatta naming it jatta da malla  meaning the place of Jatts. Many people from other parts of Azad Kashmir villages have also moved to Ratta for a better life. The first travelers from this entire region to the west were from Ratta.

Demography

According to the Pakistan census of 1998, its population was 3,152.

References

Populated places in Mirpur District